Cover Girl, Shawn Colvin's third full-length album, was released in 1994 on Columbia Records. Colvin is a singer-songwriter who usually records her own material, however, as the title alludes to, all of the tracks on the album are covers of previously recorded songs. The album received a Grammy nomination for Best Contemporary Folk Album.

Track listing

Personnel 
 Shawn Colvin – guitar, vocals
 Jim Keltner – drums
 Steve Addabbo – guitar
 Kenny Aronoff – drums, percussion
 Benmont Tench – Hammond organ
 Larry Campbell – fiddle, pedal steel
 Mary Chapin Carpenter – vocals
 Milt Grayson – background vocals
 David Kahne – bass, keyboards
 Curtis King – background vocals
 Larry Klein – bass
 Andy Kravitz – drums
 Steuart Smith  – guitar, bass, mandolin, keyboards
 Fonzi Thornton  – background vocals
 Frank Vilardi – drums, percussion
 Ken White – background vocals
 Leland Sklar – bass
 Frank Floyd – background vocals
 Tom "T-Bone" Wolk – bass, accordion

References 

1994 albums
Shawn Colvin albums
Albums produced by David Kahne
Columbia Records albums
Covers albums